Ivory Coast–Mexico relations are the diplomatic relations between Ivory Coast (Côte d'Ivoire) and Mexico. Both nations are members of the United Nations.

History

Diplomatic relations between the Ivory Coast (Côte d'Ivoire) and Mexico were established on 13 November 1975. In 1981, Ivory Coast opened an embassy in Mexico City, however, the embassy was closed in 1990 for financial reasons. In 1981, Ivorian Foreign Minister Simeon Aké paid a visit to Mexico to attend the North-South Summit in Cancún. In March 2002, Ivorian Foreign Minister Aboudramane Sangaré paid a visit to Mexico to attend the International Conference on Financing for Development Summit in Monterrey. In 2004, Ivory Coast re-opened its embassy in Mexico.

Relations between both nations became limited during the First Ivorian Civil War (2002-2004) and Second Ivorian Civil War (2010-2011). In 2009, Mexico was a non-permanent member of the United Nations Security Council and was responsible for enforcing and maintaining the United Nations Security Council Resolution 1572 on an arms embargo to the Ivory Coast. In May 2008, two Mexican senators paid a visit to the Ivory Coast and met with Ivorian Parliamentarians and with Ivorian President Laurent Gbagbo.

In December 2013, Mexican President Enrique Peña Nieto, while traveling to South Africa to attend the funeral for Nelson Mandela, made a stopover in Ivory Coast. President Peña Nieto was received at the airport by the
Ivorian Minister of Petroleum and Energy, Adama Toungara. On his return home to Mexico from South Africa, President Peña Nieto made a second stopover in Ivory Coast and was met by the Secretary General of the Ministry of
Foreign Affairs, Claude Dassys Beke.

In February 2016, the National Autonomous University of Mexico bestowed  the "UNESCO-UNAM Jaime Torres Bodet International Award" to Ivorian poet and novelist Bernard Binlin Dadié for his modern literature of the African continent. In May 2019, Ivorian Foreign Minister Marcel Amon-Tanoh paid a visit to Mexico and met with Mexican Foreign Minister Marcelo Ebrard. During the visit, both nations stressed the importance of strengthening bilateral political dialogue.

High-level visits

High-level visits from Ivory Coast to Mexico
 Foreign Minister Simeon Aké (1981)
 Foreign Minister Aboudramane Sangaré (2002)
 Foreign Secretary General Claude Dassys Beke (2013)
 Minister for Planning and Development Albert Abdallah Mabri Toikeusse (2014)
 Minister of the Environment Rémy Kouadio (2014)
 Foreign Minister Charles Koffi Diby (2015)
 Foreign Minister Marcel Amon-Tanoh (2019)

High-level visits from Mexico to Ivory Coast
 Senator Salomón Jara Cruz (2008)
 Senator José Julián Sacramento (2008)
 President Enrique Peña Nieto (2013)
 Foreign Minister José Antonio Meade (2013)
 Foreign Undersecretary Lourdes Aranda Bezaury (2013)
 Director General of ProMéxico Francisco González Díaz (2016)

Bilateral agreements
Both nations have signed a few bilateral agreements such as a Memorandum of Understanding for the Establishment of a Mechanism of Consultation in Matters of Mutual Interest (1999); Agreement on Educational and Cultural Cooperation (1999); Memorandum of Understanding between ProMéxico and the Center for the Promotion of Côte d'Ivoire investment (2016) and a Memorandum of Understanding in Academic Collaboration between both nations Ministries of Foreign Affairs.

Trade
In 2018, trade between Ivory Coast and Mexico totaled US$98 million. Ivory Coast's main exports to Mexico include: cacao, nuts and almonds. Mexico's main export to Ivory Coast is petroleum. Mexican multinational company Sukarne operates in Ivory Coast.

Diplomatic missions 
 Ivory Coast has an embassy in Mexico City.
 Mexico is accredited to Ivory Coast from its embassy in Rabat, Morocco and maintains an honorary consulate in Abidjan.

References

 
Mexico
Ivory Coast